Mary O'Reilly may refer to:
 Mary Margaret O'Reilly, American civil servant
 Mary Boyle O'Reilly, Irish-American social reformer, clubwoman, and journalist
 Mary Jane O'Reilly, New Zealand dancer and choreographer